Israelis ( Yiśraʾelim) are the citizens or permanent residents of the State of Israel, a multiethnic state populated by people of different ethnic backgrounds. The largest ethnic groups in Israel are Jews (75%), followed by Arabs (20%) and other minorities (5%).


Academics

Archaeology 
 Israel Finkelstein
 Amihai Mazar
 Benjamin Mazar
 Eilat Mazar
 Yigael Yadin
 Amit Romano

Biology and medicine 

 Aaron Valero – Professor of Medicine, founder of Faculty of Medicine at the Technion, director of  government hospital
 Aaron Ciechanover and Avram Hershko – ubiquitin system; Lasker Award (2000), Nobel Prize in Chemistry (2004)
 Moshe Feldenkrais – invented Feldenkrais Method used in movement therapy
 Hossam Haick – inventor of an electric nose for diagnosis of cancer
 Israel Hanukoglu – structures of cytoskeletal keratins, NADP binding proteins, steroidogenic enzymes, Epithelial Sodium Channels (ENaC)
 Gavriel Iddan – inventor of capsule endoscopy
 Benjamin Kahn – marine biologist, defender of the Red Sea reef
 Alexander Levitzki – cancer research; Wolf Prize in Medicine (2005)
 Yadin Dudai – memory research
 Gideon Mer – scientist, malaria control
 Saul Merin – ophthalmologist, author of Inherited Eye Diseases
 Raphael Mechoulam – chemist, discoverer of tetrahydrocannabinol and anandamide
 Leo Sachs – blood cell research; Wolf Prize in Medicine (1980)
 Asya Rolls – psychoneuroimmunologist
 Michael Sela and Ruth Arnon – developed Copaxone; Wolf Prize in Medicine (1998)
Rahel Straus (1880–1963) – German-Jewish medical doctor and feminist
 Joel Sussman – 3D structure of acetylcholinesterase, Elkeles Prize for Research in Medicine (2005)
 Meir Wilchek – affinity chromatography; Wolf Prize in Medicine (1987)
 Ada Yonath – structure of ribosome, Nobel Prize in Chemistry (2009)
 Amotz Zahavi – Handicap Principle
 Abraham Zangen – psycholobiology

Computing and mathematics 

 Ron Aharoni – mathematician
 Noga Alon – mathematician, computer scientist, winner of the Gödel Prize (2005)
 Shimshon Amitsur – mathematician ring theory abstract algebra
 Robert Aumann – mathematician game theory; Nobel Memorial Prize in Economic Sciences (2005)
 Amir Ban and Shay Bushinsky – programmers of Junior (chess)
 Yehoshua Bar-Hillel – machine translation
 Joseph Bernstein – mathematician
 Eli Biham – differential cryptanalysis
 Yair Censor – mathematician
 Aryeh Dvoretzky – mathematician, eighth president of the Weizmann Institute of Science
 Uriel Feige – computer scientist, winner of the Gödel Prize (2001)
 Abraham Fraenkel – ZF set theory
 Hillel Furstenberg – mathematician; Wolf Prize in Mathematics (2006/7)
 Shafi Goldwasser – computer scientist, winner of the Gödel Prize (1993 and 2001)
 David Harel – computer science; Israel Prize (2004)
 Gad M. Landau – computer scientist
 Abraham Lempel and Jacob Ziv – LZW compression; IEEE Richard W. Hamming Medal (2007 and 1995)
 Joram Lindenstrauss – mathematician Johnson–Lindenstrauss lemma
 Elon Lindenstrauss – mathematician
 Michel Loève – probabilist
 Joel Moses – MIT provost and writer of Macsyma
 Yoram Moses – computer scientist, winner of the Gödel Prize (1997)
 Judea Pearl – artificial intelligence, philosophy of action; Turing Award (2011)
 Ilya Piatetski-Shapiro – representation theory; Wolf Prize in Mathematics (1990)
 Amir Pnueli – temporal logic; Turing Award (1996)
 Michael O. Rabin – nondeterminism, primality testing; Turing Award (1976)
 Shmuel Safra – computer scientist, winner of the Gödel Prize (2001)
 Nir Shavit – computer scientist, winner of the Gödel Prize (2004)
 Adi Shamir – RSA encryption, differential cryptanalysis; Turing Award (2002)
 Saharon Shelah – logic; Wolf Prize in Mathematics (2001)
 Ehud Shapiro – Concurrent Prolog, DNA computing pioneer
 Moshe Y. Vardi – computer scientist, winner of the Gödel Prize (2000)
 Avi Wigderson – randomized algorithms; Nevanlinna Prize (1994)
 Doron Zeilberger – combinatorics

Engineering 
 David Faiman – solar engineer and director of the National Solar Energy Center
 Yoram Koren – mechanical engineering
 Liviu Librescu – Professor of Engineering Science and Mechanics at Virginia Tech, killed in the Virginia Tech massacre
 Hagit Messer Yaron – professor of electrical engineering
 Moshe Zakai – electrical engineering
 Jacob Ziv – electrical engineering

Humanities 
 Aharon Dolgopolsky – linguist: Nostratic
 Moshe Goshen-Gottstein – Biblical scholar
 Elias Khoury – law
 Hans Jakob Polotsky – linguist
 Chaim Rabin – Biblical scholar
 Alice Shalvi – English literature, educator
 Gershon Shaked – Hebrew literature
 Shemaryahu Talmon – Biblical scholar
 Emanuel Tov – Biblical scholar
 Ghil'ad Zuckermann – linguist, revivalist

Philosophy 
 Martin Buber
 Berl Katznelson
 Yeshayahu Leibowitz
 Avishai Margalit
 Joseph Raz
 Gershom Scholem

Physics and chemistry 

 Yakir Aharonov – Aharonov–Bohm effect; Wolf Prize in Physics (1998)
 Amiram Barkai – biochemist
 Jacob Bekenstein – black hole thermodynamics; Wolf Prize in Physics (2012)
 David Deutsch – quantum computing pioneer; Paul Dirac Prize (1998)
 Joshua Jortner and Rafi Levine – molecular energy; Wolf Prize in Chemistry (1988)
 Josef Imry – physicist
 Aaron Katzir – physical chemistry
 Ephraim Katzir – immobilized enzymes; Japan Prize (1985) The fourth president of Israel List of presidents of Israel
 Michael Levitt – Nobel Prize in Chemistry (2011)
 Zvi Lipkin – physicist
 Dan T. Major – professor of chemistry
 Boris Mavashev – seismologist
 Mordehai Milgrom – Modified Newtonian Dynamics (MOND)
 Yuval Ne'eman – the "Eightfold way"
 Asher Peres – quantum theory
 Giulio Racah – spectroscopy
 Nathan Rosen – EPR paradox
 Nathan Seiberg – string theory
 Dan Shechtman – quasicrystals; Wolf Prize in Physics (1999), Nobel Prize in Chemistry (2013)
 Igal Talmi – nuclear physics
 Reshef Tenne – discovered inorganic fullerenes and non-carbon nanotubes
 Arieh Warshel – Nobel Prize in Chemistry (2013)
 Chaim Weizmann – acetone production
Uri Banin – chemist

Social sciences 

 Yehuda Bauer – historian
 Daniel Elazar – political scientist
 Esther Farbstein – historian
 Haim Ginott – psychologist: child psychology
 Eliyahu Goldratt – business consultant: Theory of Constraints
 Louis Guttman – sociologist
 Yuval Noah Harari – historian and author who wrote best selling book Sapiens: A Brief History of Humankind
 Michael Harris – public policy scholar and university administrator
 Elhanan Helpman – economist: international trade
 Daniel Kahneman – behavioural scientist: prospect theory; Nobel Memorial Prize in Economic Sciences (2002)
 Smadar Lavie – anthropologist
 Benny Morris – historian
 Erich Neumann – analytical psychologist: development, consciousness
 Nurit Peled-Elhanan – educator
 Renee Rabinowitz – psychologist and lawyer
 Sheizaf Rafaeli – management, information, communication
 Anat Rafaeli – organisational behaviour
 Ariel Rubinstein – economist
 Moshe Sharon – historian
 Avi Shlaim – historian
 Abraham Solomonick – semiotician, linguist
 Amos Tversky – behavioral scientist: prospect theory with Daniel Kahneman
 Hanan Yoran – historian

Activists 

 Uri Avnery – peace activist, Gush Shalom
 Yael Dayan – writer, politician, activist
 Esther Eillam – feminist activist
 Uzi Even – gay rights activist
 Yehuda Glick – activist for Jewish rights at the Temple Mount
 Shula Keshet – Mizrahi feminist, activist and artist
 Hagar Rublev (1954–2000) – peace activist
 Uri Savir – peace negotiator, Peres Center for Peace
 Israel Shahak – political activist
 Natan Sharansky – Soviet-era human rights activist
 Ronny Edry and Michal Tamir – originators of the Israel-Loves-Iran peace movement and its offshoots

Architects 
 Michael Arad
 Ram Karmi
 Richard Kauffmann
 David Kroyanker
 David Resnick
 Moshe Safdie
 Arieh Sharon

Athletes

Association Football (soccer) 

 
 Avram Grant  – Israeli head coach & manager (Chelsea F.C. & Israel national team)
 Eyal Ben Ami – midfielder various clubs, national team 
 Yaniv Ben-Nissan – midfielder
 Dudu Aouate – goalkeeper (RCD Mallorca, national team)
 Jonathan Assous – defensive midfielder (Hapoel Petah Tikva), of French origin
 Gai Assulin – winger/attacking midfielder (Manchester City, national team)
 Ronen Badash – midfielder
 Pini Balili – striker (Bnei Yehuda Tel Aviv, Israel national team)
 Yossi Benayoun – attacking midfielder, (Israel national tema captain, as well as the national most capped footballer) Hapoel Be'er Sheva, Maccabi Haifa, Racing Santander, West Ham United, Liverpool, Chelsea
 Gil Cain – defender, Hapoel Azor
 David "Dedi" Ben Dayan – left defender (Hapoel Tel Aviv, national team)
 Tal Ben Haim – center back/right back, Maccabi Tel Aviv, Bolton Wanderers, Chelsea, West Ham United
 Daniel Brailovski – midfielder (Argentina, Uruguay, and Israel national teams)
 Roberto Colautti – Argentine born-striker
 Tomer Chencinski – goaltender (Vaasan Palloseura)
 Avi Cohen – defender, Liverpool and national team
 Tamir Cohen – midfielder (Bolton Wanderers and national team)
 Rami Gershon – centre back / left back
 Tvrtko Kale – Croatia/Israel, goalkeeper (Hapoel Haifa)
 Yaniv Katan – forward/winger (Maccabi Haifa, national team)
 Eli Ohana – won UEFA Cup Winners' Cup and Bravo Award (most outstanding young player in Europe); national team; manager
 Haim Revivo – attacking/side midfielder (Israel national team), Maccabi Haifa, Celta de Vigo, Fenerbahçe, Galatasaray
 Ronnie Rosenthal – left winger/striker (Israel national team), Maccabi Haifa, Liverpool, Tottenham, Watford
 Ben Sahar – striker/winger (Hapoel Tel Aviv, national team)
 Mordechai Spiegler – striker (Israel national team), manager
 Idan Tal – midfielder (Beitar Jerusalem FC and Israel national team)
 Salim Tuama – soccer player playing for Hapoel Tel Aviv who has in the past played for Standard Liège, Maccabi Petah Tikva, Kayserispor, Larissa and the youth club Gadna Tel Aviv Yehuda.
 Yochanan Vollach – defender (Israel national team); current president of Maccabi Haifa
 Pini Zahavi – UK-based super-agent
 Itzik Zohar – attacking midfielder (Israel national team), Maccabi Jaffa, Maccabi Tel Aviv, Royal Antwerp, Beitar Jerusalem, Crystal Palace, Maccabi Haifa, Maccabi Herzliya, Maccabi Netanya, F.C. Ashdod, Hapoel Nazareth Illit
 Eyal Berkovic – attacking midfielder (English Premier League clubs & Celtic F.C. & Israel national team)
 Eran Zahavi – forward (PSV Eindhoven & Israel national team captain, as well as the national top goalscorer)
 Manor Solomon – winger/attacking midfielder (Fulham F.C. & Israel national team)

Basketball 

 Miki Berkovich – Maccabi Tel Aviv
 David Blu – (formerly "Bluthenthal"), Euroleague 6' 7" forward (Maccabi Tel Aviv)
 Tal Brody – Euroleague 6' 2" shooting guard, Maccabi Tel Aviv
 Tal Burstein – Maccabi Tel Aviv
 Omri Casspi – 6' 9" small forward, drafted in 1st round of 2009 NBA Draft (Golden State Warriors)
 Tanhum Cohen-Mintz – 6' 8" center; 2x Euroleague All-Star
 Shay Doron – WNBA 5' 9" guard, University of Maryland (New York Liberty)
 Lior Eliyahu – 6' 9" power forward, NBA draft 2006 (Orlando Magic; traded to Houston Rockets), but completed mandatory service in the Israel Defense Forces and played in the Euroleague (Maccabi Tel Aviv)
 Tamir Goodman – U.S. and Israel, 6' 3" shooting guard
 Yotam Halperin – 6' 5" guard, drafted in 2006 NBA draft by Seattle SuperSonics (Olympiacos) 
 T. J. Leaf – NBA basketball player
 Gal Mekel – NBA basketball player
 Yehoshua Rozin – basketball coach
 Derrick Sharp – American-Israeli basketball player
 Amit Tamir – 6' 10" center/forward, University of California, PAOK Thessaloniki (Hapoel Jerusalem)

Bodybuilding 
 Alana Shipp – American/Israeli IFBB professional bodybuilder

Boxing 

Salamo Arouch (The Ballet Dancer) – middleweight champion of Greece, lightweight, welterweight, middleweight. He survived the Holocaust by boxing (over 200 bouts) for the entertainment of Nazi officers in Auschwitz Concentration Camp. His story was portrayed in the 1989 film "Triumph of the Spirit"
 Sarah Avraham – kickboxer, 2014 Women's World Thai-Boxing Champion in 57–63 kilos (125–140 pounds)
 Hagar Finer – WIBF bantamweight champion
 Yuri Foreman – U.S. middleweight and World Boxing Association super welterweight champion
 Roman Greenberg – ("The Lion from Zion"), International Boxing Organization's Intercontinental heavyweight champion
 Pavlo Ishchenko – 2-time European Amateur Boxing Championships medalist, and European Games medalist 	
Yulia Sachkov – world champion kickboxer

Fencing 

 Boaz Ellis (born 1981) – foil, 5-time Israeli champion
 Yuval Freilich (born 1995) – épée, 2019 European Epee Champion
 Lydia Hatoel-Zuckerman (born 1963) – foil, 6-time Israeli champion
 Delila Hatuel (born 1980) – Olympic foil fencer
 Noam Mills (born 1986) – epee, junior female world champion, 4-time Israeli champion
 Ayelet Ohayon (born 1974) – foil, European champion
 Tomer Or (born 1978) – foil, junior world champion
 Andre Spitzer  (1945–1972) – killed by terrorists

Figure skating 
 Alexei Beletski – ice dancer, Olympian
 Oleksii Bychenko – figure skater, Olympian, European silver medallist 2016
 Galit Chait – ice dancer, World Championship bronze 2002
 Natalia Gudina – figure skater, Olympian
 Tamar Katz – figure skater
 Lionel Rumi – ice dancer
 Sergei Sakhnovsky – ice dancer, World Championship Bronze medal 2002
 Daniel Samohin – figure skater, Olympian, 2016 World Junior Champion
 Michael Shmerkin – figure skater
 Alexandra Zaretski – ice dancer, Olympian
 Roman Zaretski – ice dancer, Olympian

Golf 

 Laetitia Beck – golfer

Gymnastics 

 Alexander Shatilov – World bronze (artistic gymnast; floor exercise)
 Artem Dolgopyat  – artistic gymnast (Olympic gold: 2020)
 Linoy Ashram – rhythmic gymnast (Olympic gold: 2020)
 Neta Rivkin – rhythmic gymnast
 Nicol Zelikman – rhythmic gymnast

Judo 

 Yael Arad – judoka (Olympic silver: 1992, European champion: 1993, world silver: 1993). First Israeli Olympic medalist; light-middleweight
 Yarden Gerbi – judoka (Olympic bronze: 2016)
 Andrian Kordon – European Championship bronze; heavyweight
 Daniela Krukower – Israeli/Argentine judoka, World Champion (under 63 kg)
 Yoel Razvozov – 2-time European Championship silver; lightweight
 Or Sasson – judoka (Olympic bronze: 2016)
 Oren Smadja – judoka (Olympic bronze: 1992; lightweight)
 Ehud Vaks – judoka (half-lightweight)
 Gal Yekutiel – European championship bronze
 Ariel Zeevi – judoka (European champion: 2000, 2003, 2004; Olympic bronze: 2004; 100 kg)

Motor racing 

 Alon Day – racing driver
 Chanoch Nissany – Formula One  racing test-driver
 Roy Nissany – World Series Formula V8 3.5  racing driver

Sailing 

 Zefania Carmel – yachtsman, world champion (420 class)
 Gal Fridman – windsurfer (Olympic gold: 2004 (Israel's first gold medalist), bronze: 1996 (Mistral class); world champion: 2002)
 Lee Korzits – windsurfer (two-time Olympian and four-time world champion)
 Lydia Lazarov – yachting world champion (420 class)
 Nimrod Mashiah – windsurfer; World Championship silver, ranked # 1 in world.
 Katy Spychakov – windsurfer; World Championship silver
 Shahar Tzuberi – windsurfer, Olympic bronze (RS:X discipline); 2009 & 2010 European Windsurf champion

Surfing 

 Anat Lelior – female surfer who competed for Israel at the 2020 Olympic Games

Swimming 
 Vadim Alexeev –  swimmer, breaststroke
 Adi Bichman – 400-m and 800-m freestyle, 400-m medley
 Yoav Bruck – 50-m freestyle and 100-m freestyle
 Anastasia Gorbenko (born 2003) – backstroke, breaststroke, and freestyle
 Eran Groumi – 100 and 200 m backstroke, 100-m butterfly
 Michael "Miki" Halika – 200-m butterfly, 200- and 400-m individual medley
 Judith Haspel – (born "Judith Deutsch"), of Austrian origin, held every Austrian women's middle and long distance freestyle record in 1935; refused to represent Austria in 1936 Summer Olympics along with Ruth Langer and Lucie Goldner, protesting Hitler, stating, "We do not boycott Olympia, but Berlin".
 Marc Hinawi – record holder in the European Games
 Amit Ivry – Maccabiah and Israeli records in Women's 100 m butterfly, Israeli record in Women's 200 m Individual Medley, bronze medal in 100 m butterfly at the European Swimming Championships.
 Dan Kutler – of U.S. origin; 100-m butterfly, 4×100-m medley relay
 Keren Leibovitch – Paralympic swimmer, 4x-gold-medal-winner, 100-m backstroke, 50- and 100-m freestyle, 200-m individual medley
 Tal Stricker – 100- and 200-m breaststroke, 4×100-m medley relay
 Eithan Urbach – backstroke swimmer, European championship silver and bronze; 100-m backstroke

Table Tennis 
 Marina Kravchenko – table tennis player, Soviet and Israel national teams
 Angelica Rozeanu – (Adelstin), of Romanian origin, 17-time world table tennis champion, ITTFHoF

Taekwondo 

 Avishag Semberg – taekwondo female athlete (Olympic bronze: 2020)

Tennis 

 Noam Behr
 Ilana Berger
 Gilad Bloom
 Jonathan Erlich – 6 doubles titles, 6 doubles finals; won 2008 Australian Open Men's Doubles (w/Andy Ram), highest world doubles ranking # 5
 Shlomo Glickstein – highest world singles ranking # 22, highest world doubles ranking # 28
 Julia Glushko
 Amir Hadad
 Harel Levy – highest world singles ranking # 30
 Evgenia Linetskaya
 Amos Mansdorf – highest world singles ranking # 18
 Tzipora Obziler
 Noam Okun
 Yshai Oliel
 Shahar Pe'er – (3 WTA career titles), highest world singles ranking # 11, highest world doubles ranking # 14
 Keren Shlomo – (3 ITF career titles)
 Shahar Perkiss
 Andy Ram – 6 doubles titles, 6 doubles finals, 1 mixed double title (won 2006 Wimbledon Mixed Doubles (w/Vera Zvonareva), 2007 French Open Mixed Doubles (w/Nathalie Dechy), 2008 Australian Open Men's Doubles (w/Jonathan Erlich), highest world doubles ranking # 5
 Eyal Ran
 Dudi Sela – highest world singles ranking # 29
 Denis Shapovalov (born 1999) – Israeli-Canadian tennis player, born in Tel Aviv, highest world singles ranking # 29
 Anna Smashnova – (12 WTA career titles), highest world singles ranking # 15

Track and field 
 Alex Averbukh – pole vaulter (European champion: 2002, 2006)
 Ayele Seteng – long distance runner, he was the oldest track and field athlete competing at the 2004 Olympics and 2008 Olympics.
 Danielle Frenkel – high jump champion
 Hanna Knyazyeva-Minenko – triple jumper and long jumper; participated in 2012 Summer Olympics
 Shaul Ladany – world-record-holding racewalker, Bergen-Belsen survivor, Munich Massacre survivor, Professor of Industrial Engineering
Lonah Chemtai Salpeter – Kenyan-Israeli Olympic marathon runner
 Esther Roth-Shachamarov – track and field, hurdler and sprinter (5 Asian Game golds)

Other 
 1972 Olympic team – see Munich Massacre
 David Mark Berger – weightlifter originally from US, Maccabiah champion (middleweight); killed in the Munich Massacre
 Max Birbraer – ice hockey player drafted by NHL team (New Jersey Devils)
Nili Block (born 1995) – world champion kickboxer and Muay Thai fighter
 Noam Dar – Israeli-born Scottish wrestler
 Oren Eizenman – ice hockey player, Israel national team; Connecticut Whale)
 Eli Elezra – professional poker player
 Boris Gelfand, Emil Sutovsky, Ilya Smirin – chess Grandmasters (~2700 peak Elo rating)
 Baruch Hagai – wheelchair athlete (multiple paralympic golds)
 Michael Kolganov – sprint canoer/kayak paddler, world champion, Olympic bronze 2000 (K-1 500-meter)
 Dean Kremer (born 1996) – Israeli-American Major League Baseball pitcher
 Ido Pariente – mixed martial artist
 Eliezer Sherbatov (born 1991) – Israeli-Canadian ice hockey player
 Chagai Zamir – Israel, 4-time Paralympic Games champion

Chefs 

 Yisrael Aharoni – chef and restaurateur & reality television judge
 Michal Ansky – female chef & reality television judge
 Jamie Geller – American born-Israeli chef
 Erez Komarovsky – first artisanal bread baker in Israel  & reality television judge
 Yotam Ottolenghi – Israeli-British chef
 Moshik Roth – chef with 2 Michelin stars  & reality television judge
 Assaf Granit – chef with 1 Michelin star  & reality television judge

Entertainment

Artists 

 Yaacov Agam – kinetic artist
 Ron Arad – designer
 Mordecai Ardon – painter
 David Ascalon – sculptor and synagogue designer
 Maurice Ascalon – sculptor and industrial designer
 Isidor Ascheim – painter and printmaker
 Mordechai Avniel – painter and sculptor
 Yigal Azrouel – fashion designer
 Ralph Bakshi – animation (director)
 Eyal ben-Moshe (Eyal B) – animator and director
 Tuvia Beeri – printmaker
 Alexander Bogen – painter
 Rhea Carmi – painter
 Yitzhak Danziger – sculptor
 Alber Elbaz – fashion designer
 Ohad Elimelech – artist, director, editor, photographer, animator, lecturer, and graphic designer
 Osnat Elkabir – dancer, artist and theatre direction
 Gadi Fraiman – sculptor
 Yitzhak Frenkel – painter
 Gideon Gechtman – sculptor
 Moshe Gershuni – painter
 Dudu Geva – artist and comic-strip illustrator
 Pinhas Golan – sculptor
 Nachum Gutman – painter
 Israel Hershberg – realist painter
 Shimshon Holzman – painter
 Leo Kahn – painter
 Shemuel Katz – illustrator
 Uri Katzenstein – visual artist
 Dani Karavan – sculptor
 Joseph Kossonogi – painter
 Elyasaf Kowner – video artist
 Sigalit Landau – video, installation, sculpture
 Alex Levac – photographer
 Batia Lishansky – sculptor
 Ranan Lurie – political cartoonist
 Lea Nikel – painter
 Zvi Malnovitzer – painter
 Tamara Musakhanova – sculptor and ceramist
 Mushail Mushailov – painter
 Ilana Raviv – painter
 Leo Roth – painter
 Reuven Rubin – painter
 Hagit Shahal – painter
 David Tartakover – graphic designer
 Anna Ticho – painter
 Igael Tumarkin – sculptor
 Yemima Ergas Vroman – painter, sculptor, installation artist
 Sergey Zagraevsky – painter
 Moshe Ziffer – sculptor

Film, TV, radio, and stage 

 
 Avital Abergel – film and TV actress
 Gila Almagor – actress
 Aviv Alush – actor
 Lior Ashkenazi – actor
 Yvan Attal – actor and director
 Mili Avital – actress
 Aki Avni – actor
 Orna Banai – actress
 Theodore Bikel – actor
 Eddie Carmel, born Oded Ha-Carmeili – actor, singer, and circus sideshow act
 Jason Danino-Holt – television presenter
 Ronit Elkabetz – actress
 David Faitelson – Mexican television sports commentator, born in Israel
 Oded Fehr – actor
 Eytan Fox – director
 Tal Friedman – actor and comedian
 Gal Gadot – actress and model & Miss Israel 2004
 Uri Geller – TV personality, self-proclaimed psychic
 Amos Gitai – director
 Yasmeen Godder – choreographer and dancer
 Arnon Goldfinger – director
 Yael Grobglas – actress
 Shira Haas – actress
 Dana Ivgy – actress
 Michael Karpin – broadcast journalist and author
 Daphna Kastner – actress; married to actor Harvey Keitel
 Juliano Mer-Khamis – actor
 Hila Klein – YouTuber of h3h3productions
 Amos Kollek – director and writer
 Dover Kosashvili – director
 Hanna Laslo – actress
 Daliah Lavi – actress
 Inbar Lavi – actress
 Bar Paly – actress and model
 Jonah Lotan – actor
 Rod Lurie – director and film critic
 Arnon Milchan – producer
 Avi Arad – producer and founder of Marvel Studios
 Samuel Maoz – director
 Ohad Naharin – choreographer
 Eyal Podell – actor
 Orna Porat – actress
 Natalie Portman – actress
 Lior Raz – actor and screenwriter
 Ze'ev Revach – actor and comedian
 Agam Rudberg – actress and model
 Avner Strauss – musician
 Haim Saban – TV producer and co-founder of Saban Entertainment
 Elia Suleiman – director
 Alona Tal – actress
 Noa Tishby – actress and producer
 Chaim Topol – actor
 Raviv Ullman – actor
 Yaron London – journalist and television host
 Keren Yedaya – director
 Becky Griffin – television host and model
 Rotem Sela  – television host, actress, and model
 Ayelet Zurer – actress
 Odeya Rush – actress and model
 Tomer Capone – actor

Musicians

Classical composers 

 Rami Bar-Niv
 Ofer Ben-Amots
 Paul Ben-Haim
 Avner Dorman
 Dror Elimelech
 Andre Hajdu
 Gilad Hochman
 Mark Kopytman
 Matti Kovler
 Betty Olivero
 Shulamit Ran
 Leon Schidlowsky
 Noam Sheriff
 Gil Shohat
 Josef Tal
 Yitzhak Yedid

Classical musicians 

 Moshe Atzmon – conductor
 Daniel Barenboim – conductor and pianist
 Rami Bar-Niv – pianist and composer
 Bart Berman – pianist
 Gary Bertini – conductor
 Natan Brand – pianist
 Yefim Bronfman – pianist
 Ammiel Bushakevitz – pianist
 Giora Feidman – clarinetist
 Ivry Gitlis – violinist
 Matt Haimovitz – cellist
Alice Herz-Sommer – pianist
 Ofra Harnoy – cellist
 Eliahu Inbal – conductor
 Sharon Kam – clarinetist
 Amir Katz – pianist
 Evgeny Kissin – pianist
 Yoel Levi – conductor
 Mischa Maisky – cellist
 Shlomo Mintz – violinist
 Itzhak Perlman – violinist
 Inbal Segev – cellist
 Gil Shaham – violinist
 Hagai Shaham – violinist
 Michael Shani – conductor
 Edna Stern – pianist
 Yoav Talmi – conductor
 Arie Vardi – pianist
Maxim Vengerov – violinist, violist, and conductor
 Ilana Vered – pianist
 Pinchas Zukerman – violinist

Popular musicians 

 Chava Alberstein – singer/songwriter
 Etti Ankri – singer/songwriter
 Yardena Arazi – singer and TV host
 Shlomo Artzi – singer/songwriter
 Ehud Banai – singer/songwriter
 Abatte Barihun – jazz saxophonist and composer
 Eef Barzelay – founder of Clem Snide
 Netta Barzilai – singer
 Miri Ben-Ari – jazz and hip hop violinist
 Mosh Ben-Ari – singer/songwriter
 Borgore – electronic dance music producer and DJ
 Mike Brant – French-language singer
 David Broza – singer/songwriter
 Matti Caspi – singer, multi-instrumentalist and composer
 Avishai Cohen – jazz bassist
 David D'Or – singer/songwriter
 Arkadi Duchin – singer/songwriter, musical producer
 Arik Einstein – singer, actor, writer
 Gad Elbaz – singer
 Ethnix – pop-rock band
 Rita Yahan-Farouz – singer, actress
 Uri Frost – rock guitarist, producer and director
 Aviv Geffen – singer/songwriter
 Eyal Golan – singer
 Gidi Gov – singer
 Dedi Graucher – Orthodox Jewish singer
 Shlomo Gronich – singer and composer
 Nadav Guedj – singer
 Sarit Hadad – Mizrahi singer
 Victoria Hanna – singer/songwriter
 Ofra Haza – singer
 Dana International – pop singer
 Ishtar – vocalist for Alabina
 Rami Kleinstein – singer/songwriter, composer
 Ehud Manor – songwriter and translator
 Amal Murkus – singer
 Infected Mushroom – musical duo
 Yael Naïm – solo singer/musician
 Ahinoam Nini (Noa) – singer
 Esther Ofarim – singer
 Yehuda Poliker – singer
 Ester Rada – singer
 Idan Raichel – Ethiopian and Israeli music
 Yoni Rechter – composer and arranger
 Berry Sakharof – singer
 Naomi Shemer – songwriter
 Gene Simmons (real name Chaim Weitz) – lead member of KISS
 Hillel Slovak – original guitarist for Red Hot Chili Peppers
 Pe'er Tasi – singer/songwriter
 Ninet Tayeb – pop rock singer and actress
 Hagit Yaso – singer
 Rika Zaraï – singer
 Nir Zidkyahu – drummer, briefly in Genesis
 Zino and Tommy – popular duo, songs in U.S. films
 Eden Ben Zaken – singer
 Noa Kirel – singer and actress

News anchors 
 Yonit Levi
 Haim Yavin
 Miki Haimovich
 Ya'akov Eilon
 Yigal Ravid
 Ya'akov Ahimeir

Poets 

 Nathan Alterman
 Yehuda Amichai
 Sivan Beskin
 Erez Biton
 Leah Goldberg
 Uri Zvi Greenberg
 Vaan Nguyen
 Dahlia Ravikovich
 Naomi Shemer – songwriter and lyricist
 Avraham Shlonsky
 Avraham Stern
 Abraham Sutzkever
 Yona Wallach
 Nathan Zach
 Zelda

Writers 

 Shmuel Yosef Agnon (Shmuel Yosef Halevi Czaczkes) – author, Nobel Prize in Literature (1966)
 Aharon Appelfeld – Prix Médicis étranger (2004)
 Yoni Ben-Menachem – journalist
 Ron Ben-Yishai – journalist
 Nahum Benari – author and playwright
 Max Brod – author, composer and friend of Kafka
 Orly Castel-Bloom – author
 Yehonatan Geffen – author, poet and lyricist
 David Grossman – author
 Batya Gur – author
 Emile Habibi – author
 Amira Hass – journalist and author
 Shmuel Katz – author and journalist
 Etgar Keret – author
 Adi Keissar – poet
 Ephraim Kishon – satirist
 Hanoch Levin – playwright
 Julius Margolin – writer
 Aharon Megged – author
 Sami Michael – author
 Samir Naqqash – author
 Uri Orlev – author, Hans Christian Andersen Award (1996)
 Amos Oz (Amos Klausner) – author and journalist, Goethe Prize (2005)
 Ruchoma Shain – author
 Meir Shalev – author and journalist
 Zeruya Shalev – author
 Moshe Shamir – author, poet
 Mati Shemoelof – poet, editor and journalist
 Chaim Walder – Haredi children's writer
 A.B. Yehoshua – author
 Benny Ziffer – author, journalist and translator

Entrepreneurs

Tech 

 Beny Alagem – founder of Packard Bell
 Moshe Bar – founder of XenSource, Qumranet
 Safra Catz – president of Oracle
 Yossi Gross – recipient of almost 600 patents, founder of 27 medical technology companies in Israel and the Chief Technology Office officer of Rainbow Medical.
 Itzik Kotler – founder and CTO of SafeBreach, Information Security Specialist
 Daniel M. Lewin – founder of Akamai Technologies
 Shai Reshef – educational entrepreneur, founder and president of University of the People
 Bob Rosenschein – founder of GuruNet, Answers.com (Israeli-based)
 Gil Schwed – founder of Check Point
 Zeev Suraski and Andi Gutmans – founders of Zend Technologies (developers of PHP)
 Arik and Yossi Vardi, Yair Goldfinger, Sefi Vigiser and Amnon Amir – founders of Mirabilis (developers of ICQ)
 Zohar Zisapel – co-founder of the RAD Group
 Iftach Ian Amit – co-founder of BeeFence, prominent Hacker and Information Security Practitioner

Other 
 Isaac Perlmutter – chairman and former CEO of Marvel Entertainment 
 Ted, Micky and Shari Arison – founder/owners of Carnival Corporation
 Yossi Dina – pawnbroker
 Dan Gertler – diamond tycoon
 Alec Gores – Israeli-American businessman and investor.
 Eli Hurvitz – head of Teva Pharmaceuticals
 Lev Leviev – diamond tycoon
 Mordecai Meirowitz – inventor of the Mastermind board game
 Aviad Meitar
 Dorrit Moussaieff – Israeli-British businesswoman, entrepreneur, philanthropist and the First Lady of Iceland
 Sammy Ofer – shipping magnate
 Guy Oseary – head of Maverick Records, manager of Madonna
 Guy Spier – author and investor
 Beny Steinmetz – diamond tycoon
 Stef Wertheimer – industrialist

Fashion models 

 Neta Alchimister (female)
 Moran Atias (female)
 Sendi Bar (female)
 Nina Brosh (female)
 Chava Mond (female)
 Pnina Rosenblum (female) – Knesset parliament member for Likud (2005–2006)
 Orly Levy-Abekasis (female) – Knesset parliament member for Likud (2009–) & minister (2020–2021)
 Noa Tishby (female)
 Tami Ben-Ami  (female)
 Sharon Ganish (female)
 Maayan Keret (female)
 Michaela Bercu (female)
 Esti Ginzburg (female)
 Yael Shelbia (female)
 Shlomit Malka (female)
 Tahounia Rubel (female)
 Yityish Titi Aynaw (female)  – Miss Israel 2013
 Shani Hazan (female) – Miss Israel 2012 at both Miss World 2012 and Miss International 2014
 Raz Meirman (male)
 Michael Lewis (male)
 Agam Rudberg (female)
 Bar Refaeli (female)
 Yael Goldman (female) 
 Odeya Rush (female) 
 Gal Gadot (female) – Miss Israel 2004
 Avigail Alfatov (female) – Na'art Israel (Miss Israel's runner-up) at Miss Universe 2015
 Miri Bohadana (female) – Na'art Israel (Miss Israel's runner-up)at Miss World 1995
 Anat Zamir (female) – Na'art Israel (Miss Israel's runner-up) at Miss World 1980
 Adi Himelbloy (female)
 Linor Abargil (female)  – Miss Israel & Miss World 1998
 Rina Mor (female)  – Miss Israel & Miss Universe 1976

Military 

 Ron Arad – MIA navigator
 Gabi Ashkenazi – Chief of the IDF General Staff
 Yohai Ben-Nun – sixth commander of the Israeli Navy
 Elihu Ben-Onn – Brigadier General, spokesman of the Israel Police
 Eli Cohen – spy
 Moshe Dayan – military leader
 Rafael Eitan – Chief of the IDF General Staff
 Gadi Eizenkot – Chief of the IDF General Staff
 David Elazar – Chief of the IDF General Staff
 Giora Epstein – combat pilot, modern-day "ace of aces"
 Hoshea Friedman – brigadier general in the IDF
 Uziel Gal – designer of the Uzi submachine gun
 Benny Gantz – Chief of the IDF General Staff
 Dan Halutz – Chief of the IDF General Staff
 Wolfgang Lotz – spy
 Tzvi Malkhin – Mossad agent, captured Adolf Eichmann
Eli Marom, former commander of the Israeli Navy
 Yonatan Netanyahu – Sayeret Matkal commando, leader of Operation Entebbe
 Ilan Ramon – astronaut on Columbia flight STS-107
 Gilad Shalit – kidnapped soldier held in Gaza, released in 2011
 Avraham Stern – underground military leader
 Yoel Strick – general
 Israel Tal – general, father of Merkava tank
 Moshe Ya'alon – Chief of the IDF General Staff
 Yigael Yadin – Chief of the IDF General Staff

Politicians 

 Golda Meir – Female Prime Minister of Israel (1969–74)
 Benjamin Netanyahu – prime minister of Israel (1996–99), (2009–); right-wing Likud party chairman
 Naftali Bennett – prime minister of Israel (2021–), leader of The Jewish Home party, minister of economy and minister of religious services (2013–present)
 Ehud Barak – prime minister (1999–2001)
 Menachem Begin – prime minister (1977–83); Nobel Peace Prize (1978)
 David Ben-Gurion – first Prime Minister of Israel (1948–54, 1955–63)
 Yitzhak Ben-Zvi – first elected/second president President of Israel (1952–63)
 Ehud Olmert – prime minister (2006–09); former mayor of Jerusalem
 Yossi Beilin – leader of the Meretz-Yachad party and peace negotiator
 Geula Cohen – politician, activist and "Israel Prize" recipient
 Abba Eban – diplomat and Foreign Affairs Minister of Israel (1966–74)
 Yuli-Yoel Edelstein – speaker of the Knesset
 Uzi Eilam – ex-director of Israel's Atomic Energy Commission
 Effie Eitam – former leader of the National Religious Party, now head of the Renewed Religious National Zionist party
 Levi Eshkol – prime minister (1963–69)
 Chaim Herzog – former president of Israel, first and only Irish-born Israeli President
 Moshe Katsav – president (2000–07), and convicted rapist
 Teddy Kollek – former mayor of Jerusalem
 Yair Lapid – leader of the Yesh Atid party, minister of finance (2013–March 2015) & minister of foreign affairs 
 Yosef Lapid – former leader of the Shinui party
 Amir Ohana – first openly gay right-wing (Likud) member of the Knesset & former minister of justice
 Shimon Peres – President of Israel (2007–2014); prime minister (1984–86, 1995–96); Nobel Peace Prize (1994)
 Yitzhak Rabin – prime minister (1974–77, 1992–95); Nobel Peace Prize (1994) (assassinated November 1995)
 Reuven Rivlin – President of Israel
 Ayelet Shaked – Knesset parliament right-wing member (2013–) & minister  (2015–)
 Yitzhak Shamir – prime minister (1983–84, 1986–92)
 Yisrael Yeshayahu Sharabi – former speaker of the Knesset
 Moshe Sharett – prime minister (1954–55)
 Ariel Sharon – prime minister (2001–06)
 Chaim Weizmann – first President of Israel (1949–52)
 Ovadia Yosef – spiritual leader of the Shas party
 Rehavam Zeevi – founder of the Moledet party,  Knesset parliament member & minister (assassinated by Palestinians in October 2001)
 Meirav Cohen – minister for social equality & Knesset parliament member (2019–)

Criminals 

 Yigal Amir – assassin of left-wing prime minister Yitzhak Rabin
 Baruch Goldstein – murderer
 Ami Popper – murderer
 Eden-Nathan Zada – murderer

Religious figures

Haredi Rabbis 

 Yaakov Aryeh Alter Gerrer – Rebbe
 Shlomo Zalman Auerbach
 Yaakov Blau
 Yisroel Moshe Dushinsky – Chief Rabbi of Jerusalem (Edah HaChareidis)
 Yosef Tzvi Dushinsky – Chief Rabbi of Jerusalem (Edah HaChareidis)
 Yosef Sholom Eliashiv
 Mordechai Eliyahu – Sephardi Chief Rabbi of Israel 1983–93, (1929–2010)
 Chaim Kanievsky
 Avraham Yeshayeh Karelitz, Chazon Ish – (1878–1953)
 Nissim Karelitz – Head Justice of Rabbinical Court of Bnei Brak
 Meir Kessler – Chief Rabbi of Modi'in Illit
 Zundel Kroizer – author of Ohr Hachamah
 Dov Landau – rosh yeshiva of Slabodka yeshiva of Bnei Brak
 Yissachar Dov Rokeach – the fifth Belzer rebbe
 Yitzchok Scheiner – rosh yeshiva of Kamenitz yeshiva of Jerusalem
 Elazar Menachem Shach, Rav Shach – (1899–2001)
 Moshe Shmuel Shapira – rosh yeshiva of Beer Yaakov
 Dovid Shmidel – Chairman of Asra Kadisha
 Yosef Chaim Sonnenfeld – Chief Rabbi of Jerusalem (Edah HaChareidis)
 Yitzchok Tuvia Weiss – Chief Rabbi of Jerusalem (Edah HaChareidis)
 Amram Zaks – rosh yeshiva of the Slabodka yeshiva of Bnei Brak
 Ovadia Yosef

Reform Rabbis 
Gilad Kariv

Religious-Zionist Rabbis 
 Shlomo Amar – Sephardic Chief Rabbi of Israel
 David Hartman
 Avraham Yitzchak Kook – pre-state Ashkenazic Chief Rabbi of the Land of Israel, (1865–1935)
 Israel Meir Lau – Ashkenazic Chief Rabbi of Israel (1993–2003), Chief Rabbi of Netanya (1978–88), (1937–)
 Aharon Lichtenstein
 Yona Metzger – Ashkenazic Chief Rabbi of Israel
 Shlomo Riskin – Ashkenazic Chief Rabbi of Efrat

See also 
 List of Israeli Nobel laureates
 List of Israel Prize recipients
 List of people by nationality
 Politics of Israel, List of Knesset members
 Culture of Israel, Music of Israel
 Science and technology in Israel
 List of Hebrew language authors, poets and playwrights
 List of Israeli Arab Muslims
 List of Dutch Israelis
 List of Israeli Druze
 List of notable Mizrahi Jews and Sephardi Jews in Israel
 List of notable Ashkenazi Jews in Israel
 List of notable Ethiopian Jews in Israel
 List of people from Jerusalem
 List of people from Haifa

References 



Related links 
 Presidents of Israel
 Prime Ministers of Israel